Mr. Topaze (released in U.S. as I Like Money) is Peter Sellers' directorial debut in 1961. Starring Sellers, Nadia Gray, Leo McKern, and Herbert Lom. His son Michael Sellers plays in the film in the role of Gaston. The film is based on the eponymous play by Marcel Pagnol.

Out of distribution for many years, a print exists in the British Film Institute National Archive, which makes it available for viewing on their website. The film was shown during the 2003 Cardiff Independent Film Festival. It was released on Blu-ray and DVD on 15 April 2019 by the BFI.

Plot

Mr. Topaze (Peter Sellers) is an unassuming school teacher in an unassuming small French town who is honest to a fault. He is sacked when he refuses to give a passing grade to a bad student, the grandson of a wealthy Baroness (Martita Hunt). Castel Benac (Herbert Lom), a government official who runs a crooked financial business on the side, is persuaded by his mistress, Suzy (Nadia Gray), a musical comedy actress, to hire Mr. Topaze as the front man for his business. Gradually, Topaze becomes a rapacious financier who sacrifices his honesty for success and, in a final stroke of business bravado, fires Benac and acquires Suzy in the deal. An old friend and colleague, Tamise (Michael Gough) questions him and tells Topaze that what he now says and practices indicates there are no more honest men.

Cast
Peter Sellers as Albert Topaze
Nadia Gray as Suzy
Herbert Lom as Castel Benac
Leo McKern	as Muche
Martita Hunt as Baroness
Michael Gough as Tamise
Anne Leon as Mrs. Tamise
Billie Whitelaw as Ernestine
Joan Sims as Colette
John Neville as Roger
John Le Mesurier as Blackmailer
Michael Sellers as Gaston

Critical reception
In The New York Times, Bosley Crowther wrote, "for the most part, Mr. Sellers keeps himself too rigidly in hand—and the blame is his, because he is also the fellow who directed the film. He avoids the comic opportunities, takes the role too seriously," concluding that, "As a consequence, he's just a little boring—and that's death for a Sellers character."

Bibliography

References

External links 
 

1961 films
British comedy films
CinemaScope films
Films based on works by Marcel Pagnol
Films directed by Peter Sellers
Films set in France
1960s business films
20th Century Fox films
1961 directorial debut films
Films shot at MGM-British Studios
1960s English-language films
1960s British films